The Castle School is a co-educational secondary school in Taunton, Somerset, England. It had 1,189 pupils aged 11 to 16 in 2017, and has had specialist Sports College status since 2003. It has been granted a second specialism in Vocational Education. During the school's Ofsted inspection in 2009, it received an "outstanding" rating in 26 out of 27 criteria. In July 2011, the school became an Academy.

Site
The original parts of the building include the tower block, and the ground floor building connected to it, which covers the canteen, main hall and science blocks. The newer buildings include the Qdos 6th Form Building, which opened in 2010 replacing two ageing mobile huts and partly extending the jubilee building, the Sealy Building, Sports Hall and Sports Centre and the Jubilee Building which opened in 2003. And the newest addition of Naylor. This has enabled departments to grow and offer more to its pupils by way of facilities and improved teaching rooms. However, the school has 1,236 pupils for a site only designed to hold 600.

Sport 
Castle School is heavily involved in sport and offers pupils a wide variety of sports such as football, basketball, tennis, golf, hockey, parkour, athletics, and many more to participate in.

References

External links 

QDOS Sixth Form

Academies in Somerset
Schools in Taunton
Secondary schools in Somerset